Ilya Sergeyevich Madilov (born 18 June 1988) is a former Russian professional football player.

Club career
He played two seasons in the Russian Football National League for FC Torpedo Moscow.

Personal life
His older brother Artyom Madilov is also a professional footballer.

External links
 Career summary at Sportbox
 

1988 births
Living people
Russian footballers
Association football goalkeepers
FC Torpedo Moscow players
FC Rostov players
FC Fakel Voronezh players